Syringophilidae is a family of mites, commonly known as quill mites. They are obligatory ectoparasites of birds, and inhabit their feather quills where they feed on subcutaneous tissue and fluids. Typically the Syringophilinae inhabit all but the body feathers (primaries, secondaries, tertials, rectrices and wing coverts), while the Picobinae specialize in infecting the body feathers internally. Quill mites have been recorded from hundreds of bird species, belonging to 95 families and 24 orders. Much knowledge of their hosts, diversity and systematics has been obtained since the late 1990s, but as of 2020 these were still considered to be poorly known.

Life cycle
A single fertilized female enters the soft calamus of a developing feather through the opening called superior umbilicus. When this is getting closed, it produces offspring; a single male and several females, which develop within this enclosed space. The offspring then fertilize each other and produce one more generation still enclosed here. Again, only a single male offspring is produced by each female, which will fertilize their sisters and cousins. Finally, fertilized females disperse to look for new feathers on the same host bird or on another one. The most frequent type of transmission is the parent-offspring route. Due to this peculiar life cycle, quill mite populations are highly inbred and subjected to an extremely reduced (if any) sexual selection pressure.

Symbionts
It is suspected that they might be a vector in transmitting strains of Wolbachia, an intracellular bacterial genus. Additionally Spiroplasma bacteria are suspected symbionts, besides potentially the pathogens Anaplasma phagocytophilum, Brucella and Bartonella.

Genera
The family contains the following genera:

Ascetomylla Kethley, 1970
Aulobia Kethley, 1970
Aulonastus Kethley, 1970
Bubophilus J. R. Philips & R. A. Norton, 1978
Calamincola Casto, 1978
Castosyringophilus Bochkov & Perez, 2003
Charadriphilus Bochkov & Chistyakov, 2001
Chenophila Kethley, 1970
Colinophilus Kethley, 1973
Creagonycha Kethley, 1970
Dissonus Skoracki, 1999
Ixobrychiphilus Skoracki, Zmudzinski & Solarczyk, 2017
Kalamotrypetes S. D. Casto, 1980
Kethleyana Kivganov, in Kivganov & Sharafat 1995
Megasyringophilus Fain, Bochkov & Mironov, 2000
Mironovia Chirov & Kravtsova, 1995
Neoaulobia Fain, Bochkov & Mironov, 2000
Neoaulonastus Skoracki, 2004
Niglarobia Kethley, 1970
Peristerophila Kethley, 1970
Philoxanthornia Kethley, 1970
Picobia Haller, 1878
Procellariisyringophilus Schmidt & Skoracki, 2007 (nom. nov. pro Syringonomus Kethley 1970 non Hope & Murphy, 1969)
Psittaciphilus Fain, Bochkov & Mironov, 2000
Selenonycha Kethley, 1970
Stibarokris Kethley, 1970
Syringonomus Kethley, 1970
Syringophiloidus Kethley, 1970
Syringophilopsis Kethley, 1970
Syringophilus Heller, 1880
Terratosyringophilus Bochkov & Perez, 2003
Torotrogla Kethley, 1970
Trypetoptila Kethley, 1970

References

Trombidiformes
Acari families